Humble Pie is the third studio album by English rock group Humble Pie. Released in 1970, it was their first album with A&M Records.

Background
Humble Pie was a transitional album and a harbinger of the band's new, heavier direction.  The material was darker than their previous two efforts, with striking contrasts in volume and style – Peter Frampton's gentle "Earth and Water Song" is buttressed between two of the heaviest tracks on the record, the band-composed [] "One Eyed Trouser Snake Rumba", and a cover of Willie Dixon's "I'm Ready".  Drummer Jerry Shirley contributed a rare lead vocal on his song "Only a Roach", a country-twinged ode to cannabis that also appeared as the B-side of the summer 1970 single "Big Black Dog".  This was their first release under the auspices of new American manager Dee Anthony – who had pushed for a louder, tighter sound both live and in the studio – and for their new label, A&M Records. At the end of 1969, Humble Pie's old label, Immediate, owned by Andrew Loog Oldham, went bankrupt – a saga chronicled by Marriott on the satirical ballad "Theme from Skint (See You Later Liquidator)".

Artwork
"Humble Pie" is often referred to by fans as "the Beardsley Album" as the main feature of the cover artwork is The Stomach Dance, an 1893–94 drawing by Aubrey Beardsley, an influential English artist and author known for his erotic illustrations. The inside of the gate-fold album features the band. The back cover is the second version of the George Frederic Watts oil painting "Hope"; and, is the back photo on the Japanese remastered version of 2016.

Track listing 
"Live With Me" – (Humble Pie) – 7:55
"Only a Roach" – (Shirley) – 2:49
"One Eyed Trouser Snake Rumba" – (Humble Pie) – 2:51
"Earth and Water Song" – (Frampton) – 6:18
"I'm Ready" – (Willie Dixon) – 4:59
"Theme from Skint (See You Later Liquidator)" – (Marriott) – 5:43
"Red Light Mamma, Red Hot!" – (Humble Pie, lyrics – Marriott) – 6:16
"Sucking on the Sweet Vine" – (Ridley) – 5:46

Personnel
Humble Pie
Steve Marriott – guitar, keyboards, vocals
Peter Frampton – guitar, keyboards, vocals
Greg Ridley – bass, guitar, vocals
Jerry Shirley – drums, guitar, vocals, lead vocals on "Only a Roach"

Additional musicians
John Wilson – drums on "Only a Roach" 
B.J. Cole – steel guitar

Technical staff
Recorded by Glyn (The Man) Johns at Olympic Sound Studios, London
Mutual Ideas by Glyn Johns / Humble Pie

References

External links
[ Billboard.com album discography]

1970 albums
Humble Pie (band) albums
Albums produced by Glyn Johns
A&M Records albums
Albums recorded at Olympic Sound Studios